Tecuala is both a municipality and a town in the Mexican state of Nayarit, on the Pacific coast. The population of the municipality was 42,237 in a total area of 1,137 km² (2000) while the population of the town and municipal seat was 14,584 (2000). One of the longest beaches in the world, Playa Novillero, is located here.

General information 
"Tecuala" is the Castilian form of the Tecuallan word, which means "place of many wild animals".

The municipality of Tecuala is located in the northern part of the state of Nayarit, between parallels 22° 14', and 22° 34' north latitude and meridians 105° 14' and 105° 45' west longitude. It is bounded in the north by the state of Sinaloa and the municipality of Acaponeta; in the south by the municipalities of Santiago Ixcuintla and Rosamorada, in the east by the municipality of Acaponeta and in the west by the Pacific Ocean.

Most of the land is flat and tending to mangrove swamps in the west, forming part of the national protected zone called Marismas Nacionales. The most important river is the Acaponeta, which flows into the Agua Brava lagoon.

Climate 
The climate is hot, tropical, subhumid, with the rainy season from July to September, and the hottest months from June to August. The average annual rainfall is 1,200 mm. and the average annual temperature is 22 °C, varying between 26 °C and 18 °C.

Economy 
The economy is based on agriculture with the main crops being sorghum, beans, tobacco, corn, chili peppers, watermelon and jícama. There is also widespread cattle raising. Shrimp farming is carried out in the many lagoons.

It is said, that former governor of Sinaloa state; Antonio Toledo Corro and Monterrey-based developers Grupo Novisa who apparently own the peninsula have a very aggressive plan with the idea to start a new era for the new Riviera which will employ hundreds of people and increase the living standards of the people who live within the area.

Tourism 
The popular Novillero beach is listed in Guinness World Records for being one of the longest beaches in the world—82 kilometers. The Acaponeta River flows into the ocean here and nearby is the Agua Brava lagoon, a place of great fishing and shrimp production. In San Felipe Aztatán, one can visit a monument to the origins of the Mexican people.

Today, Tecuala is the new target for real estate developers focused on tourist matters.

References

External links
XETD Radio Paraiso de Tecuala
Enciclopedia de los Municipios Mexicanos
Instituto Nacional de Estadística

Populated places in Nayarit
Municipalities of Nayarit